The Belize Defence Force Air Wing  is the aviation branch of the Belize Defence Force. Formed in 1983, it is based at the Philip S. W. Goldson International Airport in Ladyville. The main tasks of the Air Wing are Reconnaissance, SAR, CASEVAC, aerial resupply and troop transport. Furthermore, they assist the police in drug interdiction and anti-smuggling operations,  and can be called upon by the Maritime Wing.

History 
Two Britten-Norman Defenders (registration BDF-01 and BDF-02) were purchased in Britain and formed the backbone of the air wing for years. The two aircraft could be equipped with light armament, making them the first armed aircraft in Belizean history. The British Forces in Belize maintained a strong position throughout the eighties and it was only in 1990, twelve years after its formation, that three Belizeans took command of the Belize Defence Force as Commandant of BDF, Guard Commander, Commander of Air & Maritime Wing.

The Air Wing had 2 or 3 Ayres Thrush planes that were used for counter insurgency and crop dusting which initially entered service in 1988. One of them may have crashed at some point. They have apparently been placed in storage due to being deemed obsolete. The Air Wing had a Dornier 27 from 1987 to 1990, and also a Beech A90 King Air from 2004 to 2006.

The Belize Defence Force Air Wing is responsible for recovering and storing captured aircraft such as drug planes and helicopters. One such incident occurred in 2015 when a helicopter was reported circling near the border with Mexico in Orange Walk. It was discovered abandoned at around 3:00 pm. The helicopter was a Bell 407 with the registration N607AZ. While it was suspected to be used for drug transportation, no evidence of drugs was found inside. The registration number was unmatched upon searching for it, so it was theorized that it was a fake registration to mislead authorities. If nobody came to claim it, the aircraft would be put into service with the Air Wing. As stated by Brig. Gen. David Jones of the Defence Force, it was unlikely to be claimed. However, no information is available to confirm this.

Through late 2015 and early 2016, two UH-1H helicopters were donated and delivered to the Air Wing from Taiwan, which use registration BDF-11 and BDF-12.

Wednesday, October 28, 2015. BMG: The mysterious Piper Seneca PA23 with registration number N32812 today lies at the Belize Defense Force (BDF) Air Wing Compound at Price Barracks in Ladyville after spending the night at the Belize Municipal Airstrip, heavily guarded by members of the BDF and the Gang Suppression Unit (GSU). According to the FAA Aircraft Registry, the plane is owned by James Stallings of Irvine, California. However up to the time of publishing this article, no one has come forward to claim the aircraft. On June 12, 2021 during a conversation with the news channel new5 live, the commander of the BDF Air Wing mentioned, now have 7 pilots and a team of support and technicians in the air force. The New5 live news channel showed the Piper Seneca PA23 standing in the hangar, with BDF07 marking and color.

Aircraft

Accidents

 In October 1998, Defender BDF-01 crashed near Orange Walk. A US Chinook helicopter retrieved it in 1999. BDF-01 was unable to be repaired, so a replacement Defender was received in 2003, with registration BDF-05.
 In 2007, BDF-05 crashed in a marshy area near the Belizean coast. No fatalities were sustained, and a US UH-60 Black Hawk airlifted it out of the area. The Defense Forces' Cessna 208 now bears the registration BDF-05, implying that it has replaced the Defender.
 One of two UH-1 helicopters(BDF12) donated by Taiwan in 2016 crashed on February 28, 2020.

References

External links
 Belize Defence Force Official Website

National air wings
Military of Belize